The Fine Arts Union (Turkish: Güzel Sanatlar Birliği) is an organisation founded by İstanbul artists in 1909. In addition to the Architecture branch other branches were also available.

Hassa Architects Association, which means Architects Affiliated with the Palace during the Ottoman Empire, can be considered the first architectural organization of these lands. A union of architects in the modern sense is the Ottoman Engineers and Architects Association, which was founded in 1908 under the leadership of Architect Kemalettin Bey. 

In the establishment of both the Ottoman Society of Engineers and Architects and the Fine Arts Union, the freedoms brought by the Second Constitutional Era, which was declared in 1908 was effective. The Second Constitutional Era and the accepted constitution therein brought freedom of association, which gave rise to the possibility of establishing both associations.

This organization, which was first established by the graduates of Sanayi-i Nefise Mektebi in 1909 under the name of Ottoman Painters Society, was reorganized as the Fine Arts Union as of March 9, 1927. Under this organization, there were painting, sculpture and ornamentation departments as well as the field of architecture. The architecture department of the Fine Arts Union later became the Istanbul branch of the Turkish Architects Association in 1934.

Painting branch 
One of the branches of the Fine Arts Union is the Painting Branch. It changed names to Türk Ressamları Cemiyeti (Turkish Painters Soceity) in 1921, and to Güzel Sanatlar Birliği Resim Derneği in 1973. It was re-formed in 1985. As of 1985, its members were Naile AKINCI, Nazan AKPINAR, Maide Arel, Rahmi Artemİz, Neşe Aybey, Cafer Bater, Hüseyin BİLİŞİK, Sabiha BOZCALI, Adil DOĞANÇAY, Nazlı Ecevit, Ruzin GERÇİN, Habib Gerez, Bedia GÜLER YÜZ, Güler HAŞİMOĞLU, Nüshet İSLİMYELİ, Necdet Kalay, Gülseren KAYALI, Zeki KIRAL, Türkân KIRAN, Gıyas Korkut, Ayşe Yazıcı Özel, Sibel ÖZKAYGISIZ, Kainat Barkan Pajonk, Numan Pura, Nermin Pura, Haluk Tezonar, Nesibe TÜRKÖMER, Naim ULUDOĞAN, Nevin Göker ULUTAŞ, and Celal Üzmen. As of at least 2005, its members also include Nihal Güres and others.

See also 

 Hassa Mimarlar Ocağı
 Osmanlı Mühendis ve Mimar Cemiyeti
 Mimarlar Derneği
 Mimarlar Odası

References

Sources

Occupational organizations
Artist groups and collectives
Arts organizations established in 1909